Operation Apocalypse is a 1981 video game published by Strategic Simulations.

Gameplay
Operation Apocalypse is a game in which simulates four World War II engagements between the Germans and Americans.

Reception
Paul Todd and Russell Sipe reviewed the game for Computer Gaming World, and stated that "Operation Apocalypse is a two player game. But if you can't find someone with which to play, the computer plays a good game. There are no less than four levels of solitaire play. The computer can even play both sides. The game contains sufficient tactical problems and complexity to give it a realistic feel."

References

External links
Review in Creative Computing
Personal Computing

1981 video games
Apple II games
Apple II-only games
Computer wargames
Strategic Simulations games
Turn-based strategy video games
Video games developed in the United States
World War II video games